Lille Torungen Lighthouse is a coastal lighthouse on the island of Lille Torungen in the municipality of Arendal in Agder county, Norway. This lighthouse, together with the nearby Store Torungen Lighthouse, mark the entrance from the Skaggerak through the outlying islands to the mainland town of Arendal. Both lighthouses were built in 1844 with the same specifications, making "twin" lighthouses marking the way to Arendal.  The two lighthouses were put on the coat-of-arms for the local municipality of Hisøy in which the lighthouses were located. Over time, both lighthouses were replaced, and the only one still standing is the Lille Torungen Lighthouse, although it is no longer in use.  The site of the Lille Torungen Lighthouse is accessible only by boat.  The island and site is open to the public, but the buildings are not.

Current lighthouse
The white structure has a red roof and sits atop a square, black, metal frame.

History
The original lighthouse was built in 1844. The lighthouse tower was replaced in 1914 with an automated tower located a short distance to the southeast from the old tower. The old tower would have been torn down if not for the action of the municipal residents who wanted to save it.

Media gallery

See also
Lighthouses in Norway
List of lighthouses in Norway

References

Lighthouses in Agder
Buildings and structures in Arendal